Nobuzane (written: 信実) is a masculine Japanese given name. Notable people with the name include:

, Japanese painter
, Japanese samurai

Japanese masculine given names